The Hyper Neo Geo 64 is an arcade system created by SNK, and released in September 1997, as the successor of the Neo Geo MVS, within the Neo Geo family.

It is the first and only SNK hardware set capable of rendering in 3D, and was meant to replace SNK's older MVS system on the market. Company executives planned for the project to bring SNK into the new era of 3D gaming that had arisen during the mid-1990s, and had planned for a corresponding home system to replace the aging and expensive AES home console.

However it never managed to match the huge success of the MVS, and reached its end of life in 1999. Only seven games were produced for the arcade variation of the system, none of which proved particularly popular, and the project was discontinued. The proposed home system never got beyond initial planning stages and only one of the arcade games, Fatal Fury: Wild Ambition, has been ported to home systems.

History
The Hyper Neo Geo 64 was conceived to bring SNK into the 3D era as well as to replace their aging Neo Geo home system.

The system was first announced in late 1995, and planned for release in late 1996. It was officially unveiled at the February 1997 AOU show, though all that was demonstrated at the show was a videotape containing a few seconds of footage of Samurai Shodown 64, which SNK announced would be the first game for the system. By mid-1997 test units were on display in Japan.

The arcade version of the system was released in September 1997, featuring a custom 64-bit RISC processor, 4 megabytes of program memory, 64 megabytes of 3D and texture memory, and 128 megabytes of memory for 2D characters and backgrounds. The first title released for the system was Road's Edge, with Samurai Shodown 64 and Fatal Fury: Wild Ambition following soon after. None were particularly well received.

By 1999, the system was discontinued, with only seven games released in total. Fatal Fury: Wild Ambition was ported to the Sony PlayStation home system.

Home system 

Although details regarding the planned home system are sparse, it is believed that like the AES console, much of the hardware from the Neo Geo 64 arcade platform would also have been present in the home system, meaning gameplay would be identical or nearly identical whether a given game was played at home or in the arcade. It is unknown what media the home system would have used.

Specifications 

 Processors:
 CPU #1 (main): 100 MHz NEC VR4300 (64-bit MIPS III)
 CPU #2 (auxiliary, handles audio I/O): V53@16 MHz 16-bit microcontroller (V33 superset)
 CPU #3 (auxiliary, handles communications I/O): KL5C80A12CFP@12.5 MHz 8-bit microcontroller (Z80 compatible)
 Memory layout:
 0x00000000..0x00FFFFFF: mainboard RAM (16 MiB)
 0x04000000..0x05FFFFFF: cartridge RAM (16 MiB)
 0x1FC00000..0x1FC7FFFF: ROM (512 KiB)
 Cartridge ROM mapping is variable.
 Sound chip: 32-channel PCM sample-based synthesis audio, with maximum sampling frequency of 44.1 kHz (CD-quality) and 32 MB of sample RAM
 Display:
 Color palette: 16.7 million
 Maximum onscreen color palette: 4,096
 3D branch: 96 MB vertex memory, 16 MB maximum texture memory
 2D sprite branch: 60 frames per second animation, 128 MB character memory
 Main functions: scaling, montage, chain, mosaic, mesh, action, up/down, right/left reverse
 Sprites per frame: 1,536 sprites
 2D scrolling branch: Up to 4 game planes, 64 MB character memory
 Main functions: scaling, revolution, morphing; horizontal/vertical screen partitioning and line scrolling

List of games 
Seven games were released, all developed and published by SNK.

See also
Aleck 64

References

External links
 Hyper Neo Geo 64 games and statistics

Arcade system boards
Neo Geo